Spy Trap was a BBC drama that ran from 1972 to 1975 on BBC1, and set around "The Department", a British counter-espionage organisation. It starred Paul Daneman as Commander Paul Ryan, a naval officer and spy chief, Prentis Hancock as Lieutenant Saunders, and Michael Gwynn as agent Carson. Other regular cast members included Julian Glover as Commander Anderson (first season only) and Tom Adams as Major Sullivan (from the second season). Spy Trap was created by Robert Barr, who also wrote the earlier BBC TV series Spycatcher, and was notable for its complex plot lines.

It ran for three seasons.

References 

1970s British drama television series
BBC television dramas
1972 British television series debuts
1975 British television series endings